Stephen Pope may refer to:

Stephen Pope, bassist for surf rock band Wavves
Stephen Pope (cricketer) (born 1983), English cricketer
Stephen B. Pope, Cornell University professor
Stephen Pope (MP) (fl. 1388), English politician

See also
Steven Pope (born 1972), South African cricketer
Steve Pope (footballer) (born 1976), English footballer
Pope Stephen (disambiguation)